Brorsson is a Swedish patronymic surname meaning "son of Bror". Notable people with the surname include:

Arvid Brorsson (born 1999), Swedish footballer
Franz Brorsson (born 1996), Swedish footballer
Mona Brorsson (born 1990), Swedish biathlete

Patronymic surnames
Swedish-language surnames